John Paul II (Karol Józef Wojtyła) was the first Polish pope of the Roman Catholic church.

John Paul II also may refer to:

 Kraków John Paul II International Airport (IATA airport code: KRK; ICAO airport code: EPKK), Cracow, Poland
 João Paulo II Airport (IATA airport code: PPL; ICAO airport code: LPPD), Sao Miguel, Azores
 John Paul II Bridge (disambiguation)
 Holy Father John Paul II Family Home in Wadowice, Poland
 John Paul II Centre (disambiguation)
 John Paul II Institute (disambiguation)
 John Paul II Foundation, for Development and International Cooperation
 John Paul II Foundation for Research and Treatment, a hospital
 John Paul II Museum (disambiguation)
 John Paul II University (disambiguation)
 John Paul II Catholic School (disambiguation)
 John Paul II Collegiate, North Battleford, Saskatchewan, Canada
 John Paul II Minor Seminary, Barangay San Luis, Antipolo City, Rizal, Philippines
 Credo: John Paul II, a 2005 music videodisc by Andrea Bocelli

See also

 
 
 Saint John Paul II (disambiguation)
 Pope John Paul II (disambiguation)
 Karol Wojtyla (disambiguation)
 Juan Pablo II (disambiguation)
 João Paulo II (disambiguation)
 John Paul (disambiguation), including John Paul Jr.
 John II (disambiguation)
 Paul II (disambiguation)
 Paul John (disambiguation)